Pine Log Creek is a  long 2nd order tributary to Richardson Creek in Anson County, North Carolina.

Course
Pine Log Creek rises about 1.5 miles northeast of Fountain Hill, North Carolina and then flows northwest to join Richardson Creek about 6 miles northwest of Burnsville.

Watershed
Pine Log Creek drains  of area, receives about 48.1 in/year of precipitation, has a wetness index of 378.38, and is about 54% forested.

References

Additional Maps

Rivers of North Carolina
Rivers of Anson County, North Carolina